Lucinda Rogers (born 1966) is an English illustrator and artist.

Biography
Rogers is widely known as an illustrator of newspaper columns, including Jonathan Meades' "A Sense of Place" in The Times, and the "Weasel" column written by Christopher Hirst, Alexander Chancellor and several others in The Independent from 1993 to 2008. Rogers also drew restaurants and chefs for a column in The Daily Telegraph by Andrew Lloyd Webber called A Matter of Taste from 1996 to 2000. From 1997 to 2001, she drew weekly for the, now defunct,  broadsheet Sunday Business.

Books illustrated by Rogers include The Dictionary of Urbanism by Robert Cowan, and  Spitalfields Life co-illustrated with other artists. Rogers contributed one hundred drawings to a cookbook by Rowley Leigh called No Place Like Home. Rogers also drew the cover and illustrations for a new translation of Histoires Naturelles by Jules Renard published by Alma Books in 2010 (the first edition of 1896 was illustrated by Henri de Toulouse-Lautrec). Rogers' work for The Guardian includes main features in the Review section.

Rogers is also known for her drawings of cities, particularly London and New York, and as a "reportage" artist, drawing directly from life. She was given special access to draw a group of 33 ink on paper works, and one work in colour, at the World Trade Center site during the cleanup process at Ground Zero in the winter of 2001–2.

A series of Rogers drawings made in Tottenham in 2015 entitled Employment Land Portfolio was exhibited during that year's London Festival of Architecture. On a similar theme, she drew scenes of the specialist printers Baddeley Brothers for their book.

Rogers was a judge at the University of the West of England 'Reportager Awards' in 2015, celebrating achievements in documentary drawing. During May 2016 Rogers exhibited drawings of workspaces in Tottenham and Frome at Rook Lane Chapel in Frome, Somerset. From June 7 through the summer of 2016, Rogers showed 'Restaurant Drawings Historic and Contemporary' at L'Escargot in Soho, London.

Rogers' work is represented in many public collections, including that of the Victoria & Albert Museum. Her drawings of New York and London have been exhibited at the Oxo Tower on London's South Bank.

In 2017 Rogers was commissioned by the House of Illustration, with support from Arts Council England, to document the changing landscape of London, with a focus on Ridley Road Market in Dalston, East London. The exhibition ‘Lucinda Rogers: On Gentrification — Drawings from Ridley Road Market’ ran from 28 October 2017 to 25 March 2018.

An exhibition of Rogers drawings of the Snape Maltings arts centre and surrounding area of Aldeburgh, Suffolk was shown from 8 September to 23 December 2018.

In 2019, Rogers published a curated collection of her reportage drawings of New York, spanning 30 years: 'New York:  Drawings 1988-2018', with foreword by Lucy Sante.

Bibliography

Books by Lucinda Rogers
 Rogers, Lucinda (Author, Artist), 'New York:  Drawings 1988-2018', Lucy Sante (Preface), Olivia Ahmad (Editor), Esterson Associates (Designer), West Street Press, 2019. ,

Books Illustrated by Lucinda Rogers 

 Cowan, Robert, 'The Dictionary of Urbanism', Streetwise Press, 2005. , 
 Gentle Author, The, 'Spitalfields life : "in the midst of life I woke to find myself living in an old house beside Brick Lane in the East End of London"', illustrations by Mark Hearld, Lucinda Rogers and Rob Ryan, Saltyard Book Co., London, 2013. 
 Leigh, Rowley, 'No place like home', illustrations by Lucinda Rogers, London, Fourth Estate, 2000. 
 Renard, Jules, 'Histoires naturelles', translated by Richard Stokes, illustrations by Lucinda Rogers, Oneworld Classics, Richmond, 2010. , 
 Rogers, John, 'The Undelivered Mardle', Darton, Longman & Todd, 2013. , 
 Townsend, Anne, [compiled by], 'Love and marriage', illustrated by Lucinda Rogers, Collins, London, 1989.

Book Cover Illustrations by Lucinda Rogers
 The Unexpected Professor by John Carey
 Six novels by Angus Wilson published in paperback by Penguin Books, 1992

Other Work
 December 2018 to present: Illustrations for Dream Palaces in Sight and Sound Magazine''

References

External links
Website
Biography at Heart Agency
Portrait of Lucinda Rogers by Lucinda Douglas-Menzies

1966 births
Living people
20th-century English women artists
21st-century English women artists
Alumni of Central Saint Martins
British contemporary artists
British women illustrators
English illustrators
Magazine illustrators
The New Yorker cartoonists